Greg Drummond (born 3 February 1989 in Forfar) is a Scottish curler from Stirling.

Career
Drummond first appeared on the world stage as the alternate for the Scottish team at the 2007 World Junior Curling Championships. The team, skipped by Logan Gray, finished sixth. Drummond made an appearance at the European Junior Curling Challenge in 2009, and represented Great Britain in the Winter University Games in Erzurum with skip Glen Muirhead, finishing fourth after a loss in the bronze medal game.

Drummond joined Tom Brewster in the 2010–11 curling season as his third, and won the Scottish Men's Curling Championship with Brewster in 2011. They represented Scotland at the 2011 Ford World Men's Curling Championship, and finished in second place with a loss in the final to Jeff Stoughton. They won the Scottish championship again in 2012, and repeated a second-place finish in the 2012 World Men's Curling Championship with a loss in the final to Glenn Howard.

On the World Curling Tour, Drummond won two Edinburgh International titles with Brewster in 2011 and 2012 and won the German Masters title with Murdoch in 2013.

February 2014 sees Greg make his Team GB Winter Olympic debut at the Sochi 2014 games alongside David Murdoch, Michael Goodfellow, Scott Andrews and Tom Brewster. The team took bronze at the 2013 European Championships. They progressed into the Olympic finals against Canada and took the silver medal.

Grand Slam record

References

External links
 

1989 births
Living people
Scottish male curlers
British male curlers
Olympic curlers of Great Britain
Olympic silver medallists for Great Britain
Olympic medalists in curling
Curlers at the 2014 Winter Olympics
Medalists at the 2014 Winter Olympics
Curlers from Stirling